Following are the results of the 1996 National Amateur Cup, the annual amateur cup held by the United States Adult Soccer Association.

Bracket

Final

See also
1996 U.S. Open Cup

References

National Amateur Cup
National Amateur Cup
1996